Sound of Speed is an extended play (EP) by Scottish rock band the Jesus & Mary Chain, released in June 1993. The EP was released by Blanco y Negro Records on 7-inch vinyl, 10-inch vinyl, cassette single, and CD single. It reached number 30 on the UK Singles Chart. William Reid and Jim Reid produced all the tracks.

Track listing
All tracks were written by William Reid and Jim Reid except where noted.

7-inch, 10-inch, and CD single (NEG66; NEG66TE; NEG66CD)
 "Snakedriver" – 3:39
 "Something I Can't Have" – 3:01
 "Write Record Release Blues" – 2:56
 "Little Red Rooster" (Willie Dixon) – 3:26
 All four tracks are on both sides of the cassette single version.

Personnel
The Jesus and Mary Chain
 Jim Reid – vocals, guitar, production
 William Reid – vocal, guitar, producer

Additional personnel
 Dick Meaney – engineering

Charts

References

The Jesus and Mary Chain albums
1993 EPs
Blanco y Negro Records singles